Tauqeer Nasir (Punjabi) is a veteran actor from Pakistan. He served as Director General (DG) of Pakistan National Council of Arts (PNCA) for the period of 2 years. He started his career in 1978 with Pakistan Television Corporation.

Early life and education
Tauqeer Nasir was born in Muzaffargarh. He finished his basic education in the cities of Dera Ghazi Khan and Multan. He graduated with a Masters degree in Mass Communications from Punjab University, Lahore in 1981.

Awards
 Pride of Performance
 Tamgha-e-Imtiaz (Medal of Excellence) Award by the Government of Pakistan in 1999.
 Nominee: Best Actor Drama Series in The 1st Indus Drama Awards 2005 for Maa Aur Mamta (Mazloom)
 Hilal-i-Muzaffargarh Award in 2019

Television
 Kikar Kanday (Punjabi drama)
 Phul Pathar (Punjabi drama)
 Ishq-Ka-Ain
 Baal-o-Par
 Kashkol (1993)
 Sona Chandi (1982)
 Landa Bazar as Yawar Kamal (2002)
 Raahain as Jhura Bhatti (PTV drama serial)
 Panah (TV series)
 Aik Haqeeqat Aik Afsana
 Samundar
 Dehleez (1981)
 Dard Aur Darman
 Parwaaz (1978)
 Kanch Ka Pul
 Kaun STN Drama – Psycho Thriller (Appeared in Last Episode)
 Matay Ghurub
 Seen Aba Seen Aba Achoo Achoo Mehran
 Yaad Piya Ki Aye
 Dharti
 Thakan as Kaashan Azmat
 Dil Awaiz as Meer Amraiz
 Khamoshi as Sabir (2017)
 Laal Ishq as Yawar Kamal (2017)
 Namak as Nawab Sikandar Hayat
 Visaal as Shahbeer
 Bisaat e Dil as Malik
 Jhoothi as Akbar
 Raiza Raiza
 Fishar

References

External links
 

Living people
Pakistani male television actors
Punjabi people
1957 births
University of the Punjab alumni
Recipients of the Pride of Performance
Recipients of Tamgha-e-Imtiaz
Government Emerson College alumni
People from Muzaffargarh District
People from Muzaffargarh